Kuseife or Kseifa is a Bedouin town (local council) in the Southern District of Israel. Kuseife was founded in 1982 as part of a government project to settle Bedouins in permanent settlements.

It is one of seven Bedouin townships in the Negev desert with approved plans and developed infrastructure (other six are: Hura, Lakiya, Ar'arat an-Naqab (Ar'ara BaNegev), Shaqib al-Salam (Segev Shalom), Tel as-Sabi (Tel-Sheva) and the city of Rahat, the largest among them).

Population
Members of several Bedouin family clans reside in Kuseife: Abu Ajaj, Elamor, el-Zabarka, el-Nasasra, the biggest of them Abu-Rabia. Other families are: Azbarga, El-Dada, Abu Juda and Abu Anam. A part of el-Nasasra and Elamor clans lives outside Kuseife in a close proximity to the Nevatim Airbase.

According to the Israel Central Bureau of Statistics (CBS), the population of Kuseife was 17,400 in December 2010 (10,300 in December 2006). Its annual growth rate is 3.6%. Kuseife's jurisdiction is 13,692 dunams (~13.7 km²).

History
Prior to the establishment of Israel, the Negev Bedouins were a semi-nomadic society that had been through a process of sedentariness since the Ottoman rule of the region.

During the British Mandate period, the administration did not provide a legal frame to justify and preserve lands’ ownership. In order to settle this issue, Israel’s land policy was adapted to a large extent from the Ottoman land regulations of 1858 as the only preceding legal frame. Thus Israel nationalized most of the Negev lands using the state’s land regulations from 1969.

Israel has continued the policy of sedentarization of Negev Bedouins imposed by the Ottoman authorities, and at first it included regulation and re-location - during the 1950s Israel has re-located two-thirds of the Negev Bedouins into an area that was under martial law. The next step was to establish seven townships built especially for Bedouins in order to sedentarize and urbanize them by offering them better life conditions, proper infrastructure and high quality public services in sanitation, health and education, and municipal services.

But not all Bedouins agree to move from tents and structures built on the state lands into apartments. In permanent planned villages like Kuseife lives about 60% of Bedouin citizens of Israel, while the rest in illegal homes spread all over North Negev.

20th century
This area appears as Kuseife in the military administration documents starting from the 1950s. After the peace treaty signed between Egypt and Israel, the Sinai Peninsula was returned to Egypt and all the IDF bases stationed there were removed to the Israeli territory, some of them to the Negev desert. One of them was a Nevatim Airbase. A township adjacent to the base appeared at the same time.

21st century
Process of sedentarization is full of hardships for any nation, since it means a harsh shift from one way of life to another - transition from wandering to permanent residence, and Bedouins whose society is based on tradition are no exception. The rate of unemployment remains high in Bedouin townships. School through age 16 is mandatory by law, but the vast majority of the population does not receive a high school education.

Yet Israel's attitude towards its Bedouin citizens has always been positive. The state uses all the means at her disposal to improve the life of the Negev Bedouin community, and Kuseife is considered to be one of several flagship projects in this sense. Unlike illegal villages with scarce access to water, electricity and services, this village provides the residents with all their basic needs.

And still according to the CBS data relevant to December 2009, a local council of Kuseife is ranked lowest (1 out of 10) in socio-economic standing (1 out of 10) with an average income NIS 4,331 to the national average of NIS 7,070 (2009). Only 43,4% of grade twelve students are eligible to graduate from high school (2008-2009).

Employment
Despite the fact that unemployment level among Negev Bedouins is high, there are several employment opportunities in the region. Several industrial parks are situated in the area - Ramat Hovav, Hura and Dimona, but the closest industrial zone to Kuseife is situated in Arad. Other job opportunities are: several chemical plants near the Dead Sea like the Dead Sea Works, different high-tech companies and textile shops. There is a number of Bedouins working in the area of service.

Entrepreneur training 
There are several organizations carrying out different activities aimed at supporting and expanding entrepreneurship in Israel's South in order to further integrate the 160,000 Bedouins living in the Negev into Israel's mainstream economy. They are primarily aimed at Bedouin women.

Arab Bedouin fashion design
Twenty Arab-Bedouin women from the towns of Rahat, Lakiya, Tel Sheva, Segev Shalom, Kuseife and Rachma participated in a sewing course for fashion design at the Amal College in Beer Sheva, including lessons on sewing and cutting, personal empowerment and business initiatives.

Infrastructure

Medical services
There are branches of several health funds (medical clinics) in Kuseife: Leumit, Clalit, Maccabi and several perinatal (baby care) centers Tipat Halav.

Education
There is a number of schools in the township and a communal activity center.

Transportation
In May 2017, a railway extension from Beersheba to Arad via Kuseife was approved.  The line would connect to the existing Beersheba-Dimona rail line at the proposed new station at Nevatim.

See also
 Arab localities in Israel
 Negev Bedouin
 Negev Bedouin women

References

External links
 Lands of the Negev, a short film presented by Israel Land Administration describing the challenges faced in providing land management and infrastructure to the Bedouins in Israel's southern Negev region

Arab localities in Israel
Bedouin localities in Israel
Local councils in Southern District (Israel)
Populated places in Southern District (Israel)